This is articles is about lists of hospitals in South America.   It contains links to the lists, number of articles in the category, and healthcare in each country, territory and dependency in South America.

Sovereign states

List of hospitals in Argentina, Healthcare in Argentina
List of hospitals in Bolivia, Healthcare in Bolivia
List of hospitals in Brazil, Healthcare in Brazil
List of hospitals in Chile, Healthcare in Chile
List of hospitals in Colombia, Healthcare in Colombia
List of hospitals in Ecuador, Health in Ecuador
List of hospitals in Guyana, Health in Guyana#Health Infrastructure
List of hospitals in Paraguay, Healthcare in Paraguay
List of hospitals in Peru, Healthcare in Peru
List of hospitals in Suriname, Health in Suriname#Healthcare
List of hospitals in Uruguay, Healthcare in Uruguay
List of hospitals in Venezuela, Healthcare in Venezuela

Territories and dependencies
Falkland Islands: One hospital, King Edward VII Memorial Hospital
List of hospitals in French Guiana, French Guiana: One full service hospital Andrée-Rosemon Hospital
South Georgia and the South Sandwich Islands have no permanent population.

See also
Lists of hospitals in Africa
Lists of hospitals in Asia
Lists of hospitals in Europe
Lists of hospitals in North America
Lists of hospitals in Oceania

References

 
 
South America-related lists